Szyszkowitz + Kowalski is an Austrian-German architectural design team made up of Karla Kowalski and Michael Szyszkowitz. Their studio in Graz was established in 1978. Szyszkowitz + Kowalski are regarded to be major co-founders of the internationally renowned Grazer Schule  (school of architecture). Originating in Graz in the 1970s, this name stands for architectural individualism of an especially creative type.  
Szyszkowitz + Kowalski put great emphasis on three-dimensional and expressive architectural language with a distinctive reference to landscape and context.

Since 2005 Szyszkowitz – Kowalski   +   Partner ZT GmbH (Partner: Michael Lyssy, Ignacio Chavero García)

In 2009 they donated the greater part of their life's work to the Berlin Akademie der Künste in a pre-mortem bequest.

Founding partner Michael Szyszkowitz died at 71 while on holiday in the Maldives in February 2016.

Projects 

Schloss Großlobming, Economics School with Boarding, Großlobming (1. Prize, Competition 1978), 1979–1981, and Primary School Großlobming 1994–1996
New Living – Alte Poststraße, Residential Units, Graz, 1982–1984
Catholic Parish-Centre Graz-Ragnitz, Church and Meeting House, (1. Prize, Competition 1983), 1984–1987
Biochemistry and Biotechnology Graz, Institutes for the Technische Universität Graz, (1. Prize, Competition 1983), 1985–1991
Kastner & Öhler, Department Store in the City Center of Graz, 6 Construction Stages, 1991–2010
City Villas Mariagrün, Graz, 1995–1997
UCI Cinema Annenhof, Graz, 1996–1997
Experimental Living at IGA Stuttgart, 1991–1993
Küppersbusch Housing Complex  for Internationale Bauausstellung Emscher Park, Gelsenkirchen, (1. Prize, Competition 1990), 1994–1998
Schiessstätte Graz  Residential Building, Graz, 1997–1999
Cultural Center St. Ulrich (Greith-Haus), St.Ulrich/Greith, 1998–2000
Inffeld Graz Study Center, Institutes for the Technische Universität Graz, (1. Prize, Competition 1990), 1998–2000 
Remise Kreuzgasse, Residential units with public facilities, Vienna, (Prize, Competition 1994), 1999–2001
High School Pernerstorfergasse, Vienna, (1. Prize, Competition 1999), 2001–2002
Nürnberg Health Care Center, Nürnberg, Germany, (Prize, Competition 1992), 2002–2004
High School Wiedner Gürtel, Vienna, (1. Prize, Competition 2000), 2002–2004
Leoben Museum Center, Leoben, (Succeeder, Wettbewerb 1999), 2004
Headquarters for the Graz Sparkasse and Sparkassensquare, Graz, (1 Prize, Competition 2005), 2005–2006
Humanic Flagship Store, Graz, 2007
  Private Residences

Awards 

"Fischer von Erlach Preis 2010" 
"ökosan 2007" Award for best technical engineering restoration
 European Union Prize for Cultural Heritage / Europa Nostra Award 2006
 Nomination for Austrian Stateprize "Consulting 2005"
 Winners of Styrian Geramb Award in 1981, 1982, 1985, 1992, 1997 and 2004
Engineerprize of the Austrian Concrete- and Cement Industry 2004 
 Winners of the Award of the Zentralvereinigung der Architekten Österreichs (Central Association of Austrian Architects) in 1982 and 1988 and 2001 
 Distinguished with the German Architecture Prize 1999 for the Housing Complex Küppersbuschgelände, Gelsenkirchen
Merit Award from the Ministry for Education and Arts  1990  
 Special Austrian "Residential Building Award"  1987
 Styrian Prize for Architecture 1983
 First Austrian Timber Construction Award 1979

Literature 

Frank R. Werner (Hg.): Szyszkowitz+Kowalski Architekturen 1994-2010, jovis Verlag, Berlin 2010, 
Akademie der Künste (Hg.): Zeichnen zum Ort / Drawn from the Site , 2010,  
Werner Durth (Hg.): Monster und andere Wahrheiten / Monsters and other Truths  mit Essays von Manfred Sack, Werner Durth, Frank Werner, Karin Wilhelm, jovis Verlag, Berlin 2006,  
Michael Szyszkowitz, Renate Ilsinger (Hg.): Architektur_STMK. Räumliche Positionen mit Schwerpunkt ab 1993, Verlag Haus der Architektur, Graz 2005, 
Szyszkowitz + Kowalski, Renate Ilsinger (Hg.): St. Ulrich im Greith – Kulturhaus / Cultural Centre, Baudokumentation 20, Verlag Haus der Architektur, Graz 2004, 
Karin Wilhelm: Idea and Form, Häuser von / Houses by Szyszkowitz+Kowalski, Birkhäuser Verlag 2003, 
Michael Szyszkowitz, Renate Ilsinger (Hg.): Architektur_Graz, Architekturbegleiter Graz, Verlag Haus der Architektur, Graz 2003, 
Heiner Hierzegger, Renate Ilsinger u. a.: Lebensraum Wohnanlage Nordberggasse Graz. Baudokumentation 19, Verlag Haus der Architektur, Graz 2002, 
Frank R. Werner: Mehrstimmiger Dialog, Studienzentrum Inffeldgründe der TU-Graz, Baudokumentation 18, Verlag Haus der Architektur, Graz 2001, 
Frank R. Werner: Räume und Freiräume, Baudokumentation 16, Verlag Haus der Architektur, Graz 1999, 
Claudia Orben: Metamorphosen eines Schlosses, Baudokumentation 11, Verlag Haus der Architektur, Graz 1996, 
Sokrates Dimitriou: Innovation eines Kaufhauses in Graz, Baudokumentation 10, Verlag aus der Architektur, Graz 1995, 
Andrea Gleiniger: Szyszkowitz+Kowalski, Monographie, Verlag Wasmuth, Graz 1994,  
Wolfgang Schäche: Szyszkowitz+Kowalski, Zwei Projekte für die Forschung, Berlin – Graz, Aedes, Galerie und Architekturforum, 1991
Frank R. Werner: Biochemie und Biotechnologie, Baudokumentation 2, Verlag Haus der Architektur, Graz 1991, 
Frank R. Werner: Arche-Tektonik pur, 5 Bauten – 5 Projekte 1985–1990. In: Architektur und Bauforum Nr. 139, 1990, Seite 19 – 42

Exhibitions 

 2011 Hamburg, AIT-Architektursalon
 2010 Berlin, Akademie der Künste
 other Exhibitions in Graz, Wien, Oslo, Edinburgh, Aberdeen, London, Liege, Nantes, Breslau, St. Moritz, Darmstadt, Gelsenkirchen, Stuttgart, Millstatt, Weimar, Berlin, Vancouver, Bologna, Klagenfurt, Mürzzuschlag

References

External links

 Online Profile
 

Architecture firms of Austria
Companies based in Graz